The battle took place when Al-Shabaab militants stormed an AMISOM base in Janale when one of its fighters rammed a vehicle packed with explosives into the perimeter of the base, then a team of heavily armed fighters entered the breach and attacked the troops inside. The attack was launched to commemorate one anniversary after the group's former leader Ahmed Abdi Godane's death, who was killed in a U.S. drone airstrike in the previous year.

References

Conflicts in 2015
2015 in Somalia
2015 in Uganda
Al-Shabaab (militant group) attacks
Janale 2015
September 2015 events in Africa